Charco Press is an independent publisher based in Edinburgh. Established in 2017 by Samuel McDowell and Carolina Orloff, Charco specialises in translating contemporary Latin American fiction into English. The publisher has met with notable success, with three titles so far nominated for the International Booker Prize. Among other honours, it published the 2021 Premio Valle Inclan winner. Its titles have also been nominated for the Republic of Consciousness Award and the TA First Translation Prize. It was named Scotland Small Press of the Year 2021 and 2019 at the Nibbies (British Book Awards), and has been nominated as Publisher of the Year in the Scottish National Literary Awards.

In 2021, three of the five nominees for the Premio Valle Inclan were published by Charco. The award was won by Fionn Petch for her translation of A Musical Offering by Luis Sagasti. It has recently obtained the rights for Jeferson Tenório's novel The Flipside of Skin, which was the 2021 winner of Brazil's most prestigious literary prize, the Premio Jabuti.

Published authors
 Katya Adaui
 Selva Almada
Ave Barrera
Cristina Bendek
Gabriela Cabezon Camara
Giuseppe Caputo
Renato Cisneros
Jorge Consiglio
Jennifer Croft
Diamela Eltit
Federico Falco
Rodrigo Fuentes
Julian Fuks
Margarita Garcia Robayo
Daniel Hahn
Ariana Harwicz
Andrea Jeftanovic
Brenda Lozano
Carla Maliandi
Daniel Mella
Sylvia Molloy
Claudia Pineiro
Ricardo Romero
Luis Sagasti
Daniel Saldana Paris
Karla Suarez
Fernanda Trias
Ida Vitale

References

Publishers